In literature, psychological fiction (also psychological realism) is a narrative genre that emphasizes interior characterization and motivation to explore the spiritual, emotional, and mental lives of the characters. The mode of narration examines the reasons for the behaviors of the character, which propel the plot and explain the story. Psychological realism is achieved with deep explorations and explanations of the mental states of the character's inner person, usually through narrative modes such as stream of consciousness and flashbacks.

Early examples

The Tale of Genji by Lady Murasaki, written in 11th-century Japan, was considered by Jorge Luis Borges to be a psychological novel. French theorists Gilles Deleuze and Félix Guattari, in A Thousand Plateaus, evaluated the 12th-century Arthurian author Chrétien de Troyes' Lancelot, the Knight of the Cart and Perceval, the Story of the Grail as early examples of the style of the psychological novel.

Stendhal's The Red and the Black and Madame de La Fayette's The Princess of Cleves are considered the first precursors of the psychological novel. The modern psychological novel originated, according to The Encyclopedia of the Novel, primarily in the works of Nobel laureate Knut Hamsun – in particular, Hunger (1890), Mysteries (1892), Pan (1894) and Victoria (1898).

Notable examples
One of the greatest writers of the genre was Fyodor Dostoyevsky. His novels deal strongly with ideas, and characters who embody these ideas, how they play out in real world circumstances, and the value of them, most notably The Brothers Karamazov and Crime and Punishment.

In the literature of the United States, Henry James, Patrick McGrath, Arthur Miller, and Edith Wharton are considered "major contributor[s] to the practice of psychological realism."

Subgenres

Psychological thriller 

A subgenre of the thriller and psychological novel genres, emphasizing the inner mind and mentality of characters in a creative work. Because of its complexity, the genre often overlaps and/or incorporates elements of mystery, drama, action, slasher, and horror — often psychological horror. It bears similarities to the Gothic and detective fiction genres.

Psychological horror 

A subgenre of the horror and psychological novel genres that relies on the psychological, emotional and mental states of characters to generate horror. On occasions, it overlaps with the psychological thriller subgenre to enhance the story suspensefully.

Psychological drama 

A subgenre of drama films with psychological elements, which focuses upon the emotional, mental, and psychological development of characters in a dramatic work. One Flew Over the Cuckoo's Nest (1975) and Requiem for a Dream (2000), both based on novels, are notable examples of this subgenre. Taxi Driver (1976) and The Wrestler (2008) are original psychological drama films.

Psychological science fiction 
A genre with films that are considered dramas or thrillers occurring in a science fiction setting. Often the focus is on the character's inner struggle dealing with political or technological forces. A Clockwork Orange (1971) is a notable examples of this genre.

References

Further reading
 George M. Johnson. Dynamic Psychology in Modernist British Fiction.  Palgrave Macmillan, U.K., 2006.

 
 
Literary genres